Ben Cunningham (1904–1975) was an American artist and teacher whose works are in the collections of the Museum of Modern Art, the Guggenheim Museum, the Whitney Museum of American Art and the Smithsonian American Art Museum. Cunningham, known for his manipulation of color, served as supervisor of mural painting for Northern California under the Works Progress Administration Federal Art Project.

Early life and education 
Cunningham was born in Cripple Creek, Colorado in 1904. He studied architecture at The University of Nevada and graduated from the California School of Fine Arts (San Francisco Art Institute).

Career 
Cunningham was elected president of the San Francisco chapter of the Artists Congress in 1936. That same year, he was appointed supervisor of mural painting for Northern California under the Works Progress Administration Federal Art Project. He moved to New York in 1944 and later taught art classes at Newark School of Fine Arts, Cooper Union, Pratt Institute and the Art Students League. Cunningham taught at the Art Students League of New York from 1967-1974.

References 

1904 births
1975 deaths
University of Nevada alumni
San Francisco Art Institute alumni
Cooper Union faculty
Pratt Institute faculty
Art Students League of New York faculty
Op art